Brady Toops is the first studio album by Brady Toops. Underspoken Records released the album on August 27, 2013.

Critical reception

Awarding the album four stars from New Release Today, Kevin Davis states, "This is a very emotional album and if you're not familiar with Brady’s passionate vocal style, this album is hook-filled with catchy melodies wrapped around very introspective, worshipful and emotional lyrics." James Yelland, rating the album a nine out of ten for Cross Rhythms, writes, "With a vintage yet contemporary sound, this album feels awash with the sound of his Nashville base ... A fine album." Giving the album four stars at Indie Vision Music, Sara Walz describes, "Brady Toops is a collection of songs that will calm the heart and pierce the soul."

Track listing

References

2013 debut albums